Saint-Ursanne is an old town and a former municipality of the district of Porrentruy in the canton of Jura, Switzerland which has preserved much of its medieval character. The town contains many historical buildings, including a Romanesque abbey church, a collegiate church, a cloister, many medieval houses, a hermitage and an 18th-century bridge. The river Doubs makes a loop near Saint-Ursanne before flowing into France. Since 2009 Saint-Ursanne has been a part of the new municipality Clos du Doubs. An active railway station is located above the town, to the east.

The town is famous for the medieval festival which it organizes each summer, and for the annual St-Ursanne - Les Rangiers International Hill Climb in August.

Its name refers to Saint Ursicinus, a seventh-century monk who built a monastery here.

Notable people 
 Ursicinus of Saint-Ursanne (7th century), an Irish missionary and hermit, his supposed sarcophagus is preserved in St-Ursanne
 Saint Wandregisel (c. 605–668 AD), a Frankish courtier, monk, and abbot; lived as a hermit in complete solitude at Saint-Ursanne
 Lionel Régal (1975 – 2010 in Saint-Ursanne), a French hillclimbing racer, died in a crash in Saint-Ursanne
 Cathérine Hug (born 1976), an art historian and curator, was brought up in Saint-Ursanne
 Benjamin Conz (born 1991 in Saint-Ursanne), a Swiss professional ice hockey goaltender

References

External links

 Events and Culture program in St-Ursanne
 "Saint-Ursanne La Fantastique !" a fantasy fair for Summer 2011, with the collaboration of the illustrator Grzegorz Rosinski

Cities in Switzerland
Clos du Doubs
Former municipalities of the canton of Jura